() is a traditional Welsh stew, made with smoked bacon, stock, potatoes and other vegetables.

As a stew, it is unique in that all the main ingredients are cut into slices, so as to lie flat. Because of this, it is normally cooked in a large frying pan, on top of the stove, and served on a plate (as opposed to a bowl). The vegetables used are typically potatoes, onions, carrots (sliced lengthwise) and peas. Although usually made with smoked bacon, minced beef is occasionally substituted.

The dish is normally accompanied by crusty bread and butter. Perhaps oddly, for a Welsh dish, it is also frequently served with Worcestershire sauce.

A similar dish, called Tatws Popty or Tatws Pobdu, is made using chunky vegetables, and cooked in an oven,  being North Welsh for "oven".

See also
 List of bacon dishes
 List of stews

References

External links
 Tatws Pum Munud, Celtnet Welsh (Cymric) Recipes
 Tatws Pum Munud, Cross cooking (a site that uses cookery as an aid to learning Welsh)

Welsh cuisine
Bacon dishes
British stews
British pork dishes